Arden Cahill Academy is a private school in Gretna, Louisiana, U.S. It was founded in 1968 by Arden and Harry Cahill.The school serves families of newborns through high school students in the New Orleans metro community.

References

External link
Arden Cahill Academy website

Educational institutions established in 1968
1968 establishments in Louisiana
Schools in Jefferson Parish, Louisiana